Fléron is a municipality of Wallonia located in the province of Liège, Belgium. 

On January 1, 2006, Fléron had a total population of 16,088. Fléron is east of the city of Liège.

The municipality consists of the following districts: Fléron, Magnée, Retinne, and Romsée.

The reminders of Fort de Fléron are in the center of the village of Fléron.

Image gallery

See also
 List of protected heritage sites in Fléron

References

External links
 

 
Municipalities of Liège Province